Lee Jon Goodwin (born 5 September 1978) is an English former footballer who played for West Ham United and Dagenham & Redbridge as a defender.

Career
Born in Stepney, London, Goodwin was a trainee at West Ham United, before signing for Dagenham & Redbridge in 1998. He scored the winning goal for Dagenham in a 2–1 victory over Doncaster Rovers after heading the ball in on 67 minutes in March 2001. He was sent off in a 0–0 draw with Doncaster in November after receiving a second yellow card after a late challenge on Neil Campbell. He suffered what was believed to be a metatarsal fracture in September 2002. He signed a new contract with Dagenham in December 2003, before signing a two-year contract in May 2004. He was ruled out for the remainder of the 2005–06 season after suffering a stress fracture of his leg in March 2006. He signed a new three-year contract in May. He made one appearance in the Football League for Dagenham, after being introduced as an 88th minute substitute against Mansfield Town on 3 May 2008. He retired from playing in July. In October 2010 he was awarded a testimonial by Dagenham. On 11 October Dagenham played a West Ham United XI at Victoria Road with The Hammers winning 3–2 in front of 2,267 spectators. He was a coach at Dagenham & Redbridge but was then appointed first-team coach with Thurrock. He became joint caretaker manager with Grant Gordon and then left the club at the end of May 2012 with the season complete.

Honours
Isthmian League: 2000
Essex Senior Cup: 2001; Runner-up 2002
Conference National: 2007
FA Youth Cup: Runner-up 1996

References

External links

1978 births
Living people
Footballers from Stepney
English footballers
Association football defenders
West Ham United F.C. players
Dagenham & Redbridge F.C. players
Grays Athletic F.C. players
English Football League players
National League (English football) players